USS Shakamaxon may refer to the following ships operated by the United States Navy:

 , was laid down in November 1863 but never completed
 , was a net laying ship in service between 1944–1963

United States Navy ship names